Fleeton is an unincorporated community in Northumberland County, in the U.S. state of Virginia.  It is located at the mouth of the Great Wicomico River.

References

Unincorporated communities in Virginia
Unincorporated communities in Northumberland County, Virginia